Gunvor Hofmo (30 June 1921 – 17 October 1995) was a Norwegian writer, often considered one of Norway's most influential modernist poets.

Background
Gunvor Hofmo was born in Oslo, Norway.  Her parents were Erling Hofmo (1893–1959) and Bertha Birkedal (1891–1969). She was raised in a working-class family  
among socialists, communists and anti-Nazis. Her father's brother  Rolf Hofmo (1898–1966) was a sports official who was arrested during  World War II and imprisoned  at the Sachsenhausen concentration camp.

Literary career

Hofmo started her literary career submitting poems for publication to a wide variety of presses, including the communist newspaper Friheten and weekly magazines such as Hjemmet. One of her first published poems was dedicated to her close friend and Jewish refugee Ruth Maier (1920-1942).
It was published in Magasinet for Alle, opening with the lines:

Ruth Maier was an Austrian native who had  found refuge in Norway in 1939.  During the Occupation of Norway by Nazi Germany,  Maier was arrested by German officials in Norway during 1942. She was deported and murdered during the Holocaust at Auschwitz. This event became by all accounts the central tragedy in Hofmo's life. She was hospitalized in 1943 for depression, starting a lifelong struggle with mental illness.

Following the liberation of Norway in 1945, Hofmo traveled extensively. She was in Paris in the autumn of 1947 and in Brittany in the spring of 1950. She also made several trips to Copenhagen and also traveled to Stockholm, Amsterdam and London. She also wrote essays for publication, primarily in the daily newspaper Dagbladet. The topics included travel, Nordic poetry, and philosophical topics. Among her most noted contributions are a lengthy debate on the minimal daily cost of living a life barely out of penury in Paris and a treatise in defense of her poet colleague Olav Kaste (1902-1991).
In 1953, she stopped publishing essays and instead concentrated on her poetry. Dagbladet published seven of her poems between 1952 and 1956. She published five poetry collections between 1946 and 1955.

She was institutionalized at Gaustad Hospital, suffering from mental illness, characterized as schizophrenia, paranoid type, from 1955 to 1971, leading to what was known as her "16 years of silence." Following her discharge, she went into a period of considerable productivity, publishing fifteen poetry collections between 1971 and 1994. From 1977 to her death she never left her apartment at Simensbråten in Oslo.

Personal life

Gunvor Hofmo and Ruth Maier both characterized their relationship as unusually close and intimate. In her diary, Ruth Maier describes Gunvor Hofmo as her lover.

In 1947, Hofmo moved in with another writer, Astrid Tollefsen (1897-1973) became one of the first Norwegians living in an openly lesbian relationship.  They continued to live and travel together until Hofmo was incapacitated and committed for her mental illness.

Works

Jeg vil hjem til menneskene – (1946) ("I want to go home to the humans")
Fra en annen virkelighet – (1948) ("From another reality")
Blinde nattergaler – (1951) ("Blind nightingales")
I en våkenatt – (1954) ("In a waking night")
Testamente til en evighet – (1955) ("A will to an eternity")
Treklang – dikt i utvalg (1963) (published with Astrid Hjertenæs Andersen and Astrid Tollefsen) ("Triad")
Gjest på jorden – (1971) ("Guest on Earth")
November – (1972)
Veisperringer – (1973) ("Road barriers")
Mellomspill – (1974) ("Interlude")
Hva fanger natten – (1976) ("What the night captures")
Det er sent – (1978) ("It is late")
Nå har hendene rørt meg – (1981) ("Now the hands have touched me")
Gi meg til berget – (1984) ("Give me to the mountain")
Stjernene og barndommen – (1986) ("The stars and the childhood")
Nabot – (1987)
Ord til bilder – (1989) ("Words to pictures")
Fuglen – (1990) ("The bird")
Epilog – (1994) ("Epilogue")
Samlede dikt – collected poems(1996)
Etterlatte dikt – poems (1997) (posthumously, edited by Jan Erik Vold)
Jeg glemmer ingen – poems (1999) (edited by Jan Erik Vold, illustrated with water color paintings by Ruth Maier) ("I forget no one")

Prizes and awards 
Gyldendal's Endowment - 1951
Kritikerprisen  for Gjest på jorden - 1971
Gyldendal's Endowment - 1974
Dobloug Prize - 1982
Riksmålsforbundets litteraturpris - 1989

References

External links
Gunvor Hofmo (Gyldendal Norsk Forlag)

Related reading
 

1921 births
1995 deaths
Writers from Oslo
Lesbian poets
Modernist women writers
Norwegian women poets
Norwegian lesbian writers
Norwegian LGBT poets
20th-century Norwegian women writers
20th-century Norwegian poets
Dobloug Prize winners
Norwegian Critics Prize for Literature winners
Burials at Vestre gravlund
20th-century Norwegian LGBT people